If You See Me may refer to:

 "If You See Me" (song), a song by The Black Keys from Thickfreakness
 If You See Me (EP), a 1997 EP by Tara MacLean